Eoscapherpeton is an extinct genus of giant salamander, known from the Late Cretaceous of Central Asia. Fossils have been found in the Cenomanian aged Khodzhakul Formation and Dzharakuduk Formation, Turonian aged Bissekty Formation and the Coniacian-Santonian aged Aitym Formation of Uzbekistan, the Santonian aged Yalovach Formation of Tajikistan, and the Santonian-lower Campanian aged Bostobe Formation and Campanian aged Darbasa Formation of Kazakhstan.

See also 
 Prehistoric amphibian
 List of prehistoric amphibians

References

Cryptobranchidae
Prehistoric amphibian genera
Turonian life
Cretaceous amphibians of Asia
Fossils of Uzbekistan
Bissekty Formation
Fossil taxa described in 1981